100 is a 2021 Indian Kannada-language crime thriller film directed by Ramesh Arvind. The film stars himself, Rachita Ram, Poorna, and newcomer Vishwa Karna. It is a remake of the Tamil film Thiruttu Payale 2. The film released on November 19, 2021.

Plot
Vishnu is an honest Inspector, who is living with his family- his mother, younger sister Hima and wife Anagha where he is also involved in benami  dealings. Vishnu's boss asks him to tap the phone calls of a few senior police officers and politicians to track their illegal activities. Vishnu learns that the politician's wives and other woman, including Anagha are having an affair with Harsha, who is a sociopath and cybercriminal, who seduces woman to fall for him and blackmails them for money. Vishnu confronts Harsha, who blackmails him by hacking Vishnu's personal computer and downloaded  the audio recordings that Vishnu has collected so far. It is revealed that Vishnu was involved in the dealings, in order to construct a hospital for the poor. Harsha leaks the call of DGP in order to get Vishnu into trouble. However, Vishnu is instead congratulated by his boss for publicly removing the DGP from competing. 

When the scandal escalates, The higher-ups in the department decide to frame Vishnu as the scapegoat to save their name. Meanwhile, Vishnu plants bugs at his house where he learns that Hima was having an affair with Harsha, not Anagha. Hima met Harsha in Facebook. When he called her to sleep with him, she learnt about his true nature and blocks his phone number, but was blackmailing by calling her from different numbers. Hima confronts Harsha and tries to have sex with her, but escapes and she learnt that he made a Lascivious photos on her and is torturing her since. Realizing that his higher-ups are framing him, Vishnu blackmails his higher-ups with their audio recordings that he is heading to kill Harsha and the charges against him should be dropped. The higher-ups follow Vishnu's orders where  Vishnu kidnaps Harsha and kills him at his guest house. Vishnu returns to work and decide to expose many cyber criminals, who are targeting women for their personal benefits.

Cast 
 Ramesh Aravind as Vishnu, cybercrime officer
 Rachita Ram as Hima, Vishnu's sister
 Poorna as Ananga, Vishnu's wife
 Vishwa Karna as Harsha, a cyber criminal
 Prakash Belawadi as Vishnu's higher officer
 Raju Talikote
 Shobaraj as DGP
 Amita Ranganath

Production
The film is produced by M Ramesh Reddy and Uma under Suraj Productions. Akash Shrivatsa worked as an editor for this film.

Soundtrack
Music is composed by Ravi Basrur.

Release and reception 
The film was released on 19 November 2021, and received positive reviews from critics. A critic from The New Indian Express said "The timing of this film is noteworthy considering digital crime is on the rise. 100 is an attempt at sensitising audiences about the crime". A critic from Deccan Herald gave four out of five and said that "Ramesh Aravind's '100', a masterfully crafted cyber crime drama, proves this. The seasoned artiste brings in his experience to craft a near-perfect suspense thriller. It's hard to find faults in the film as it shines in all departments". A critic from Bangalore Mirror gave the same rating. A critic from The Times of India gave the film a rating of 3.5/5 and said that "100 has a pertinent message that deals with how social media has taken over most lives. This can be a good choice for a family movie outing for this weekend".

References

External links
  100 at IMDb

Indian thriller films
Indian crime thriller films
Kannada remakes of Tamil films
Films directed by Ramesh Aravind